KRP may refer to:

 Home Political Representation (KRP) a WWII Polish organization
 The IATA code for Midtjyllands Airport
 Kinesin related proteins
 National Bureau of Investigation (Finland)